The 2004 Pacific Rim Championship and the 2004 Pacific Cup was the 9th Pacific Cup, a rugby league tournament held between Pacific teams. The tournament was hosted in Auckland and for the first time split into two competitions; The Pacific Rim Championship between national teams and the Pacific Cup between Auckland-based selections. In the final of the Pacific Rim competition the Cook Islands defeated New Zealand Māori 46-6 while Samoa XIII defeated Tonga XIII 52–18 to win the Pacific Cup.

Background
The tournament, organised by both the New Zealand Rugby League and Pacific Island Rugby League Association (PIRLA), was a revival of the Pacific Cup which had not been held since 1997 due to the Super League war. The aim of the Pacific Rim Championship was to promote awareness of the game in the region with a view to re-establishing international fixtures and full contact with the main nations Australia, Great Britain and New Zealand in the near future.

The teams that participated in the 2004 Pacific Rim competition were: Tonga, Fiji, New Zealand Māori, Niue, Samoa and the Cook Islands. The Pacific Cup included Auckland Māori, New Caledonia, Samoa XIII, Tonga XIII and two other teams.

The official opening was held as part of the pre-match programme for the Tri-Nations test match between Australia and the New Zealand Kiwis on 16 October. A colourful parade of flags representing the participating countries was led into the stadium in front of about 20,000 spectators before kick-off.

Matches were played at Waitemata Stadium, Ericsson Stadium and North Harbour Stadium.

Squads
The Pacific Rim competition featured international and New Zealand based players while the Pacific Cup squads were limited to Auckland-based players with the exception of New Caledonia who sent a development squad.

Pacific Rim squads

New Zealand Māori
New Zealand Māori were coached by Tawera Nikau who was assisted by Terry Hermansson.

Fiji
The Fijian squad was composed mainly of locally based players.

Pacific Rim Competition

Pool A

Pool B

Bowl Final

Grand Final

Pacific Cup

Pool A

Pool B

Final

References

External links

Oceania Cup
Pacific Cup
International rugby league competitions hosted by New Zealand
2004